The 2004–05 Coupe de la Ligue, a knockout cup competition in French football organised by the Ligue de Football Professionnel, began on 5 October 2004. The final was held on 30 April 2005 at the Stade de France. RC Strasbourg defeated SM Caen 2–1 in the final.

First round

Second round

Third round

Final draw

Final draw results

Quarter-finals

Semi-finals

Final

Top goalscorers

External links
Ligue de Football Professionnel 
RSSSF page

Coupe de la Ligue seasons
France
League Cup